The Isuzu Traga is a small cab over pickup truck manufactured by Isuzu since 2018. It is developed to compete with the Mitsubishi L300 in the Indonesian medium pickup truck market. It replaces the L300-based Bison and Panther pickup in the market.

It is manufactured and primarily sold in Indonesia, and is exported to other Southeast Asian countries since 2019 as well. The Philippines is the first export destination, where it is sold as the Isuzu Traviz.

The "Traga" name is derived from the phrase "X-tra (Ekstra) Lega", which means "extra spacious" in Indonesian.

Overview 
The Traga was launched in Indonesia on 23 April 2018, and is offered in two variants: Flat Deck and Box.

In the Philippines, the Traviz was launched on 13 November 2019 and is available in two body styles: S and L. Before the "Traviz" name is used, it was showcased as under the "VT02" name in October 2018.

Engine 
The Traga is powered by a direct-injected low-pressure turbocharged 2.5-litre 4JA1-L inline-four diesel engine taken from the Panther.

The Traviz uses a Euro4 compliant common rail direct-injected version of the 4JA1 engine.

Gallery

Sales

References

External links 

  (Indonesia)

Traga
Cab over vehicles
Vehicles introduced in 2018